The Piscataway  or Piscatawa , are Native Americans. They spoke Algonquian Piscataway, a dialect of Nanticoke. One of their neighboring tribes, with whom they merged after a massive decline of population following two centuries of interactions with European settlers, called them the Conoy.

Two major groups representing Piscataway descendants received state recognition as Native American tribes in 2012: the Piscataway Indian Nation and Tayac Territory and the Piscataway Conoy Tribe of Maryland. Within the latter group was included the Piscataway Conoy Confederacy and Sub-Tribes and the Cedarville Band of Piscataway Indians. All these groups are located in Southern Maryland. None are federally recognized.

Name
The Piscataway were recorded by the English (in days before uniform spelling) as the Pascatowies, Paschatoway, Pazaticans, Pascoticons, Paskattaway, Pascatacon, Piscattaway, and Puscattawy. They were also referred to by the names of their villages: Moyaonce, Accotick, or Accokicke, or Accokeek; Potapaco, or Portotoack; Sacayo, or Sachia; Zakiah, and Yaocomaco, or Youcomako, or Yeocomico, or Wicomicons.

Related Algonquian-speaking tribes included the Anacostan, Chincopin, Choptico, Doeg, or Doge, or Taux; Tauxeneen, Mattawoman, and Pamunkey. More distantly related tribes included the Accomac, Assateague, Choptank, Nanticoke, Patuxent, Pokomoke, Tockwogh and Wicomoco.

Language
The Piscataway language was part of the large Algonquian language family. Jesuit missionary Father Andrew White translated the Catholic catechism into Piscataway in 1640, and other English missionaries compiled Piscataway-language materials.

Geography

The Piscataway by 1600 were on primarily the north bank of the Potomac River in what is now Charles, southern Prince George's, and probably some of western St. Mary's counties in southern Maryland, according to John Smith's 1608 map – wooded; near many
waterways. This also notes the several Patuxent River settlements that were under some degree of Piscataway suzerainty. The Piscataway settlements appear in that same area on maps through 1700 Piscataway descendants now inhabit part of their traditional homelands in these areas. None of the three state-recognized tribes noted above has a reservation or trust land. Their status as "landless" Indians had contributed to their difficulty in proving historical continuity and being recognized as self-governing tribes.

Traditional culture
The Piscataway relied more on agriculture than did many of their neighbors, which enabled them to live in permanent villages. They lived near waters navigable by canoes. Their crops included maize, several varieties of beans, melons, pumpkins, squash and (ceremonial) tobacco, which were bred and cultivated by women. Men used bows and arrows to hunt bear, elk, deer, and wolves, as well as smaller game such as beaver, squirrels, partridges, and wild turkeys. They also did fishing and oyster and clam harvesting. Women also gathered berries, nuts and tubers in season to supplement their diets.

As was common among the Algonquian peoples, Piscataway villages consisted of several individual houses protected by a defensive log palisade. Traditional houses were rectangular and typically 10 feet high and 20 feet long, a type of longhouse, with barrel-shaped roofs covered with bark or woven mats. A hearth occupied the center of the house with a smoke hole overhead.

History

Precontact
A succession of indigenous peoples occupied the Chesapeake and Tidewater region, arriving according to archeologists' estimates from roughly 3,000 to 10,000 years ago. Those people of Algonquian stock who would coalesce into the Piscataway nation, lived in the Potomac River drainage area since at least AD 1300. Sometime around AD 800, peoples living along the Potomac had begun to cultivate maize as a supplement to their ordinary hunting-gathering diet of fish, game, and wild plants.

Some evidence suggests that the Piscataway migrated from the Eastern Shore, or from the upper Potomac, or from sources hundreds of miles to the north. It is fairly certain, however, that by the 16th century the Piscataway was a distinct polity with a distinct society and culture, who lived year-round in permanent villages.

The onset of a centuries-long "Little Ice Age" after 1300 had driven Algonquian and Iroquoian peoples from upland and northern communities southward to the warmer climate of the Potomac basin. Growing seasons there were long enough for them to cultivate maize. As more tribes occupied the area, they competed for resources and had an increasing conflict.

By 1400, the Piscataway and their Algonquian tribal neighbors had become increasingly numerous because of their sophisticated agriculture, which provided calorie-rich maize, beans and squash. These crops added surplus to their hunting-gathering subsistence economy and supported greater populations. The women cultivated and processed numerous varieties of maize and other plants, breeding them for taste and other characteristics. The Piscataway and other related peoples were able to feed their growing communities. They also continued to gather wild plants from nearby freshwater marshes. The men cleared new fields, hunted, and fished.

17th century and English colonization

By 1600, incursions by the Susquehannock and other Iroquoian peoples from the north had almost entirely destroyed many of the Piscataway and other Algonquian settlements above present-day Great Falls, Virginia on the Potomac River. The villages below the fall line survived by banding together for the common defense. They gradually consolidated authority under hereditary chiefs, who exacted tribute, sent men to war, and coordinated the resistance against northern incursions and rival claimants to the lands. A hierarchy of places and rulers emerged: hamlets without hereditary rulers paid tribute to a nearby village. Its chief, or werowance, appointed a "lesser king" to each dependent settlement. Changes in social structure occurred and religious development exalted the hierarchy. By the end of the 16th century, each werowance on the north bank of the Potomac was subject to the paramount chief: the ruler of the Piscataway known as the Tayac.

The English explorer Captain John Smith first visited the upper Potomac River in 1608. He recorded the Piscataway by the name Moyaons, after their "king's house", i.e., capital village or Tayac's residence, also spelled Moyaone. Closely associated with them were the Nacotchtank people (Anacostans) who lived around present-day Washington, DC, and the Taux (Doeg) on the Virginia side of the river. Rivals and reluctant subjects of the Tayac hoped that the English newcomers would alter the balance of power in the region.

In search of trading partners, particularly for furs, the Virginia Company, and later, Virginia Colony, consistently allied with enemies of the settled Piscataway. Their entry into the dynamics began to shift regional power. By the early 1630s, the Tayac's hold over some of his subordinate werowances had weakened considerably.

However, when the English began to colonize what is now Maryland in 1634, the Tayac Kittamaquund managed to turn the newcomers into allies. He had come to power that year after killing his brother Wannas, the former Tayac. He granted the English a former Indian settlement, which they renamed St. Mary's City after Queen Henrietta Marie, the wife of King Charles I.

The Tayac intended the new colonial outpost to serve as a buffer against the Iroquoian Susquehannock incursions from the north. Kittamaquund and his wife converted to Christianity in 1640 by their friendship with the English Jesuit missionary Father Andrew White, who also performed their marriage. Their only daughter Mary Kittamaquund became a ward of the English governor and of his sister-in-law, colonist Margaret Brent, both of whom held power in St. Mary's City and saw to the girl's education, including learning English.

At a young age, Mary Kittamaquund married the much older English colonist Giles Brent, one of Margaret's brothers. After trying to claim Piscataway territory upon her father's death, the couple moved south across the Potomac to establish a trading post and live at Aquia Creek in present-day Stafford County, Virginia. They were said to have had three or four children together. Brent married again in 1654, so his child bride may have died young.

Benefits to the Piscataway in having the English as allies and buffers were short-lived. The Maryland Colony was initially too weak to pose a significant threat. Once the English began to develop a stronger colony, they turned against the Piscataway. By 1668, the western shore Algonquian were confined to two reservations, one on the Wicomico River and the other on a portion of the Piscataway homeland. Refugees from dispossessed Algonquian nations merged with the Piscataway.

Colonial authorities forced the Piscataway to permit the Susquehannock, an Iroquoian-speaking people, to settle in their territory after having been defeated in 1675 by the Iroquois Confederacy (Haudenosaunee), based in New York. The traditional enemies eventually came to open conflict in present-day Maryland. With the tribes at war, the Maryland Colony expelled the Susquehannock after they had been attacked by the Piscataway. The Susquehannock suffered a devastating defeat.

Making their way northward, the surviving Susquehannock joined forces with their former enemy, the Haudenosaunee, the five-nation Iroquois Confederacy. Together, the Iroquoian tribes returned repeatedly to attack the Piscataway. The English provided little help to their Piscataway allies. Rather than raise a militia to aid them, the Maryland Colony continued to compete for control of Piscataway land.

Piscataway fortunes declined as the English Maryland colony grew and prospered. They were especially adversely affected by epidemics of infectious disease, which decimated their population, as well as by intertribal and colonial warfare. After the English tried to remove tribes from their homelands in 1680, the Piscataway fled from encroaching English settlers to Zekiah Swamp in Charles County, Maryland. There they were attacked by the Iroquois but peace was negotiated.

In 1697, the Piscataway relocated across the Potomac and camped near what is now The Plains, Virginia, in Fauquier County. Virginia settlers were alarmed and tried to persuade the Piscataway to return to Maryland, though they refused. Finally in 1699, the Piscataway moved north to what is now called Heater's Island (formerly Conoy Island) in the Potomac near Point of Rocks, Maryland. They remained there until after 1722.

18th century
In the 18th century, the Maryland Colony nullified all Indian claims to their lands and dissolved the reservations. By the 1720s, some Piscataway as well as other Algonquian groups had relocated to Pennsylvania just north of the Susquehannah River. These migrants from the general area of Maryland are referred to as the Conoy and the Nanticoke. They were spread along the western edge of the Pennsylvania Colony, along with the Algonquian Lenape who had moved west from modern New Jersey, the Tutelo, the Shawnee and some Iroquois. The Piscataway were said to number only about 150 people at that time. They sought the protection of the powerful Haudenosaunee, but the Pennsylvania Colony also proved unsafe.

Most of the surviving tribe migrated north in the late eighteenth century and were last noted in the historical record in 1793 at Detroit, following the American Revolutionary War, when the United States gained independence. In 1793 a conference in Detroit reported the peoples had settled in Upper Canada, joining other Native Americans who had been allies of the British in the conflict.  Today, descendants of the northern migrants live on the Six Nations of the Grand River First Nation reserve in Ontario, Canada.

Some Piscataway may have moved south toward the Virginia Colony. They were believed to have merged with the Meherrin.

19th century
Numerous contemporary historians and archaeologists, including William H. Gilbert, Frank G. Speck, Helen Rountree, Lucille St. Hoyme, Paul Cissna, T. Dale Stewart, Christopher Goodwin, Christian Feest, James Rice, and Gabrielle Tayac, have documented that a small group of Piscataway families continued to live in their homeland. Although the larger tribe was destroyed as an independent, sovereign polity, descendants of the Piscataway survived. They formed unions with others in the area, including European indentured servants and free or enslaved Africans. They settled into rural farm life and were classified as free people of color, but some kept Native American cultural traditions. For years the United States censuses did not have separate categories for Indians. Especially in the slave states, all free people of color were classified together as black, in the hypodescent classification resulting from the racial caste of slavery.

In the late 19th century, archaeologists, journalists, and anthropologists interviewed numerous residents in Maryland who claimed descent from tribes associated with the former Piscataway chiefdom. Uniquely among most institutions, the Catholic Church consistently continued to identify Indian families by that classification in their records. Such church records became valuable resources for scholars and family and tribal researchers. Anthropologists and sociologists categorized the self-identified Indians as a tri-racial community. They were commonly called a name (regarded as derogatory by some) "Wesorts."

In the 19th century, census enumerators classified most of the Piscataway individuals as "free people of color", "Free Negro" or "mulatto" on state and federal census records, largely because of their intermarriage with blacks and Europeans. The dramatic drop in Native American populations due to infectious disease and warfare, plus a racial segregation based on slavery, led to a binary view of race in the former colony. By contrast, Catholic parish records in Maryland and some ethnographic reports accepted Piscataway self-identification and continuity of culture as Indians, regardless of mixed ancestry. Such a binary division of society in the South increased after the American Civil War and the emancipation of slaves. Southern whites struggled to regain political and social dominance of their societies during and after the Reconstruction era. They were intent on controlling the freedmen and asserting white supremacy.

Revitalization: 20th–21st century
Although a few families identified as Piscataway by the early 20th century, prevailing racial attitudes during the late 19th century, and imposition of Jim Crow policies, over-determined official classification of minority groups of color as black. In the 20th century, Virginia and other southern states passed laws to enforce the "one-drop rule", classifying anyone with a discernible amount of African ancestry as "negro", "mulatto", or "black". For instance, in Virginia, Walter Plecker, Registrar of Statistics, ordered records to be changed so that members of Indian families were recorded as black, resulting in Indian families losing their ethnic identification.

Phillip Sheridan Proctor, later known as Turkey Tayac, was born in 1895. Recent investigations have determined that his claims to indigenous ancestry are false. Proctor revived the use of the title tayac, a hereditary office which he claimed had been handed down to him. Turkey Tayac was instrumental in the revival of American Indian culture among Piscataway and other Indian descendants throughout the Mid-Atlantic and Southeast. He was allied with the American Indian Movement Project for revitalization.

Chief Turkey Tayac was a prominent figure in the early and mid-twentieth century cultural revitalization movements. His leadership inspired tribes other than the Piscataway, and revival has also occurred among other Southeastern American Indian communities. These include the Lumbee, Nanticoke, and Powhatan of the Atlantic coastal plain. Assuming the traditional leadership title "tayac" during an era when American Indian identity was being regulated to some extent by blood quantum, outlined in the Indian Reorganization Act, Chief Turkey Tayac organized a movement for American Indian peoples that gave priority to their self-identification.

There are still Indian people in southern Maryland, living without a reservation in the vicinity of US 301 between La Plata and Brandywine. They are formally organized into several groups, all bearing the Piscataway name.

After Chief Turkey Tayac died in 1978, the Piscataway split into three groups (outlined below): the Piscataway Conoy Confederacy and Subtribes (PCCS), the Cedarville Band of Piscataway Indians, and the Piscataway Indian Nation. These three organizations have disagreed over a number of issues: seeking state and federal tribal recognition, developing casinos on their land if recognition were gained, and determining which groups were legitimately Piscataway.

Two organized Piscataway groups have formed:
Piscataway Indian Nation and Tayac Territory headed by Billy Redwing Tayac, indigenous rights activist and son of the late Chief Turkey Tayac;
Piscataway Conoy Tribe, which is split between two tribal entities:
Piscataway Conoy Confederacy and Sub-Tribes
Cedarville Band of Piscataway Indians, led by Natalie Proctor.

In the late 1990s, after conducting an exhaustive review of primary sources, a Maryland-state appointed committee, including a genealogist from the Maryland State Archives, validated the claims of core Piscataway families to Piscataway heritage. A fresh approach to understanding individual and family choices and self-identification among American Indian and African-American cultures is underway at several research universities. Unlike during the years of racial segregation, when all people of any African descent were classified as black, new studies emphasize the historical context and evolution of seventeenth, eighteenth, nineteenth, and twentieth century ethnic cultures and racial categories.

The State of Maryland appointed a panel of anthropologists, genealogists, and historians to review primary sources related to Piscataway genealogy. The panel concluded that some contemporary self-identified Piscataway descended from the historic Piscataway.

In 1996 the Maryland Commission on Indian Affairs (MCIA) suggested granting state recognition to the Piscataway Conoy Confederacy and Subtribes. Critics were concerned about some of the development interests that backed the Piscataway Conoy campaign, and feared gaming interests. (Since the late twentieth century, many recognized tribes have established casinos and gaming entertainment on their reservations to raise revenues.) Gov. Parris Glendening, who was opposed to gambling, denied the tribe's request.

In 2004, Governor Bob Ehrlich also denied the Piscataway Conoy's renewed attempt for state recognition, stating that they failed to prove that they were descendants of the historical Piscataway Indians, as required by state law. Throughout this effort, the Piscataway-Conoy stated they had no intent to build and operate casinos.

In December 2011, the Maryland Commission on Indian Affairs stated that the Piscataway had provided adequate documentation of their history and recommended recognition. On January 9, 2012, Gov. Martin O'Malley issued executive orders recognizing all three Piscataway groups as Native American tribes. As part of the agreement that led to recognition, the tribes renounced any plans to launch gambling enterprises, and the executive orders state that the tribes do not have any special "gambling privileges".

Notable Piscataway
Mary Kittamaquund (c. 1634 – c. 1654/1700), daughter of tribal leader, Kittamaquund 
Turkey Tayac (Phillip Sheridan Proctor) (1895–1978), tribal leader and herbal doctor.
Gladys Proctor (Carrier of the Pipe) (1919–2018) Clan Mother of the Wild Turkey Clan, Cedarville Band and noted scholar of Piscataway history and culture. Her research and archiving of tribal information helped to gain tribal recognition in 2012.
Delonte West, retired NBA basketball player

See also

Black Indians in the United States
Brass Ankles
Maroon people
Melungeon
Nanjemoy
Piscataway-Conoy Tribe of Maryland
Redbone
List of place names in Maryland of Native American origin

Notes

References
.

Further reading
Barbour, Philip L. The Three Worlds of Captain John Smith. Boston: Houghton Mifflin Co., 1964.
Barbour, Philip L., ed. The Jamestown Voyages Under the First Charter, 1606-1609. 2 vols. Works issued by the Hakluyt Society, 2nd series nos. 136–137. Cambridge, England, 1969.
Chambers, Mary E. and Robert L. Humphrey. Ancient Washington—American Indian Cultures of the Potomac Valley. George Washington University, Washington, D.C. 1977.
Goddard, Ives (1978). "Eastern Algonquian Languages", in Bruce Trigger (ed.), Handbook of North American Indians, Vol. 15 (Northeast). Washington, DC: Smithsonian Institution, pp. 70–77.
Griffin, James B. "Eastern North American Prehistory: A Summary." Science 156 (1967):175-191.
Hertzberg, Hazel. The Search for an American Indian Identity: Modern Pan Indian Movements. NY: Syracuse University Press, 1971.
Merrell, James H. "Cultural Continuity Among the Piscataway Indians of Colonial Maryland." William & Mary Quarterly, 3rd series, 36 (1979): 548–70.
Potter, Stephen R. Commoners, Tribute, and Chiefs: The Development of Algonquian Culture in the Potomac Valley. Charlottesville: University Press of Virginia, 1993.
Rice, James D. Nature and History in the Potomac Country: From Hunter-Gatherers to the Age of Jefferson. Baltimore: Johns Hopkins University Press, 2009.
Rountree, Helen C., Clark, Wayne E. and Mountford, Kent. John Smith's Chesapeake Voyages, 1607-1609, Charlottesville: University of Virginia Press, 2007.
Tayac, Gabrielle. "National Museum of the American Indian ? 'We Rise, We Fall, We Rise' ? a Piscataway Descendant Bears Witness at a Capital Groundbreaking," Smithsonian 35, no. 6 (2004): 63–66.

External links

 Official website
, Official website
, Catholic Encyclopedia, 1911

Native Americans in Maryland